Itaúsa is a Brazilian multinational conglomerate holding company headquartered in São Paulo, Brazil. It is one of the largest private conglomerates in Brazil, and one of the largest in the world. The company controls several companies active in areas such as the financial and real estate sectors; industries including wood panels, pottery and metal; health; chemicals; and fashion. The main companies that Itaúsa controls are Itaú Unibanco, Duratex and Alpargatas S.A.

The control of the company rests with the Setubal and Villela families along with the Camargo family as minority holder.

References

External links
 BM&F Bovespa: ITSA3 / ITSA4

 
Companies listed on B3 (stock exchange)
Companies based in São Paulo
Conglomerate companies of Brazil
Conglomerate companies established in 1966
Brazilian companies established in 1966